Frederick Hogg (24 April 1918 – 2001) was an English professional footballer who played in the Football League for Halifax Town, Luton Town and Mansfield Town.

References

1918 births
2001 deaths
English footballers
Association football inside forwards
English Football League players
West Auckland Town F.C. players
Luton Town F.C. players
Mansfield Town F.C. players
Halifax Town A.F.C. players
Wigan Athletic F.C. players